Anti-discrimination law or non-discrimination law refers to legislation designed to prevent discrimination against particular groups of people; these groups are often referred to as protected groups or protected classes. Anti-discrimination laws vary by jurisdiction with regard to the types of discrimination that are prohibited, and also the groups that are protected by that legislation. Commonly, these types of legislation are designed to prevent discrimination in employment, housing, education, and other areas of social life, such as public accommodations. Anti-discrimination law may include protections for groups based on sex, age, race, ethnicity, nationality, disability, mental illness or ability, sexual orientation, gender, gender identity/expression, sex characteristics, religion, creed, or individual political opinions.

Anti-discrimination laws are rooted in principles of equality, specifically, that individuals should not be treated differently due to the characteristics outlined above. At the same time, they have often been criticised as violations of the inherent right of free association. Anti-discrimination laws are designed to protect against both individual discrimination (committed by individuals) and from structural discrimination (arising from policies or procedures that disadvantage certain groups). Courts may take into account both discriminatory intent and disparate impact in determining whether a particular action or policy constitutes discrimination.

International

Equality and freedom from discrimination are outlines as basic human rights by the Universal Declaration of Human Rights (UDHR). While the UDHR is not binding, nations make a commitment to uphold those rights through the ratification of international human rights treaties. Specific treaties relevant to anti-discrimination law include the International Covenant on Civil and Political Rights, the International Covenant on Economic, Social and Cultural Rights, the Convention on the Elimination of All Forms of Discrimination against Women, and the International Convention on the Elimination of All Forms of Racial Discrimination. In addition, the United Nations Sustainable Development Goal 10 and Goal 16 also advocates for international efforts towards eliminating discriminatory laws.

History of anti-discrimination legislation

Australia

The Racial Discrimination Act 1975 was the first major anti-discrimination legislation passed in Australia, aimed at prohibiting discrimination based on race, ethnicity, or national origin. Jurisdictions within Australia moved shortly after to prohibit discrimination on the basis of sex, through acts including the Equal Opportunity Act 1977 and the Anti-Discrimination Act 1977. The Australian parliament expanded these protections with the Sex Discrimination Act 1984 (SDA) to cover all Australians and provide protections based on sex, relationship status, and pregnancy. Additionally, the SDA has been expanded to include gender identity and intersex status as protected groups. Discrimination based on disability status is also prohibited by the Disability Discrimination Act 1992.

Belgium

The first Belgian anti-discrimination law of 25 February 2003 was annulled by the Belgian Constitutional Court. The Court ruled that the law was discriminative since its scope didn't include discrimination on the basis of a political opinion or language and thus violated the articles 10-11 of the Belgian Constitution, instituting the principle of equality before law.

A new law came into force on the 9th of June 2007. This law prohibits any use of direct or indirect discrimination on the basis of age, sexual preference, marital status, birth, wealth, religion or belief, political or syndical opinion, language, current or future state of health, disability, physical or genetical property or social origin.

European Union

The European Union has passed several major anti-discrimination directives, the Racial Equality Directive and the Employment Equality Directive, and the Equal Treatment Directive. These directives set standards for all member countries of the European Union to meet; however each member state is responsible for creating specific legislation to achieve those goals.

All EU member states are also member states to the European Convention on Human Rights. Thus, article 14 of the Convention applies, which concerns a prohibition on discrimination on the ground of sex, race, colour, language, religion, political or other opinion, national or social origin, association with a national minority, property, birth or other status.

United Kingdom

Laws forbidding discrimination in housing, public facilities and employment were first introduced in the 1960s covering race and ethnicity under the Race Relations Act 1965 and the Race Relations Act 1968.

In the 1970s, anti-discrimination law was significantly expanded. The Equal Pay Act 1970 allowed women to bring action against their employer if they could show that they were being paid less compared to a male colleague for equal work or work of the same value. The Sex Discrimination Act 1975 forbade both direct and indirect discrimination on the basis of sex, and the Race Relations Act 1976 expanded the scope of anti-discrimination law on the basis of race and ethnicity.

In the 1990s, protections against discrimination on the basis of disability was added primarily through the Disability Discrimination Act 1995.

In the 2000s, the scope of employment anti-discrimination laws were expanded to cover sexual orientation (with the passage of the Employment Equality (Sexual Orientation) Regulations 2003), age (the Employment Equality (Age) Regulations 2006), and religion/belief (Employment Equality (Religion or Belief) Regulations 2003).

In 2010, existing anti-discrimination law was combined into a single Act of Parliament, the Equality Act 2010. The Equality Act contains provisions forbidding direct, indirect, perceptive and associative discrimination on the basis of sex, race, ethnicity, religion and belief, age, disability, sexual orientation and gender reassignment. Employment law also protects employees from worse treatment based on being part-time workers, agency workers or being on fixed-term contracts.

United States

In 1868 after the American Civil War, the Fourteenth Amendment to the United States Constitution was ratified, including the Equal Protection Clause. It was an effort by John Bingham and other Radical Republicans to protect formerly-enslaved people from discrimination. Nevertheless, the promises of this and other Reconstruction Amendments went largely unfulfilled for nearly a century thanks to the profusion of racist Jim Crow laws designed to oppress persons of color and reinforce racial segregation in the United States. The Civil Rights Act of 1964 was the next major development in anti-discrimination law in the US, though prior civil rights legislation (such as the Civil Rights Act of 1957) addressed some forms of discrimination, the Civil Rights Act of 1964 was much broader, providing protections for race, colour, religion, sex, or national origin in the areas of voting, education, employment, and public accommodations. This landmark legislation led the way for other federal legislation, which expanded upon the protected classes and forms of discrimination prohibited under federal legislation, such as the Fair Housing Act or the Americans with Disabilities Act. These protections have also been expanded through the courts interpretation of these pieces of legislation. For example, the U.S. Courts of Appeals for the Seventh and Second Circuits, and later the U.S. Supreme Court in Bostock v. Clayton County, Georgia, ruled that employment discrimination based on sexual orientation is a violation of Title VII of the Civil Rights Act. In addition to federal legislation, there are numerous state and local laws that address discrimination that is not covered by these laws.

Effects

United States

Americans with Disabilities Act of 1990

Employment rates for all disabled men and disabled women under 40 have decreased since the implementation of the ADA. This effect is especially pronounced for those with mental disabilities and for those with lower levels of education. However, there is evidence to suggest that the decrease in employment rates is partially explained by increased participation in educational opportunities. These decreases can be attributed to increased costs for employers to remain in compliance with ADA provisions; rather than bearing increased costs, companies hire fewer workers with disabilities. While popular conception is that the ADA has created the opportunity for legal recourse for those with disabilities, less than 10% of ADA related cases find in favor of the plaintiff.

Prior to 1960

David Neumark and Wendy Stock found evidence that sex discrimination/equal pay laws boosted the relative earnings of black and white females and conversely reduced the relative employment of both black women and white women.

Exceptions

Where anti-discrimination legislation is in force, exceptions are sometimes included in the laws, particularly affecting the military and religious organizations.

Military

In many nations with anti-discrimination legislation, women are excluded from holding certain positions in the military, such as serving in a frontline combat capacity or aboard submarines. The reason given varies; for example, the British Royal Navy cite the reason for not allowing women to serve aboard submarines as medical and related to the safety of an unborn fetus, rather than that of combat effectiveness.

Religious organizations

Some religious organizations are exempted from legislation. For example, in Britain the Church of England, in common with other religious institutions, has historically not allowed women to hold senior positions (bishoprics) despite sex discrimination in employment generally being illegal; the prohibition was confirmed by a vote by the Church synod in 2012.

Selection of teachers and pupils in schools for general education but with a religious affiliation is often permitted by law to be restricted to those of the same religious affiliation even where religious discrimination is forbidden.

See also

 List of anti-discrimination acts
 Labour law
 Discrimination (Employment and Occupation) Convention (ILO Convention No. 111)
 Anti-discrimination laws in Brazil
 Employment equity (Canada)
 Employment discrimination law in the United States
 Employment discrimination law in the United Kingdom
 History of women in the military
 LGBT rights by country or territory
 Public accommodations
 Reasonable accommodation

References

External links

Handbook on European non-discrimination law, Fundamental Rights Agency, 2011